The Bluejacket 23 is a  Canadian trailerable, fibreglass monohull sailboat designed by Cuthbertson & Cassian (C&C Designs) as a day sailer and club racer and first built in 1967.

Production
The boat was built by Paceship Yachts in Mahone Bay, Nova Scotia, Canada. It was first offered in 1967 in the Daysailer version, with a roomy cockpit and an open cuddy (cabin). By 1970 it was also offered in the MORCEE version, a modification of the original design, which was adapted to comply with the Midget Ocean Racing Club Rule (MORC) by fitting a self-bailing cockpit and enclosing the cabin. A total of at least 107 boats were produced (including both versions, based on known hulls) between 1967 and 1974. It is now out of production.

Design
The Paceship Bluejacket 23 is a small recreational keelboat. It has a fractional rig, a spade rudder, and a fixed fin keel. It displaces  and carries  of iron ballast. The design of the Bluejacket 23 is very similar to several other Cuthbertson & Cassian designs built in Ontario around the same time, including the Classic 22 by Grampian Marine (which predated the Bluejacket), and the Viking 22 and later Gazelle 22 from Ontario Yachts.

Hull and deck
The hull, deck and interior liners are integrally molded of multi-laminate fiberglass construction, built by the hand-layup method using polyester resins,  mat and  roving throughout the boat. Positive flotation is provided by large blocks of foam contained inside the cockpit seats and in the bow. A non-skid pattern is molded into deck and cockpit surfaces. There are two fixed lights in the cabin top for visibility and interior illumination. The deck is reinforced with plywood that is sandwiched into the laminate. All hardware is either bolted through or tapped into metal which is bonded into the laminate.

Interior liner (Daysailer only)
The Daysailer interior liner is a one piece moulding. It is not integral with the deck. No self-bailing is provided in this model. It is recommended that a boom-tent be used to reduce the amount of rain water getting into the boat. A bilge pump would also be a useful extra.

Interior liner (MORCEE version)
The MORCEE has a self-bailing cockpit with the cockpit an integral part of the deck. The cuddy cabin is enclosed with a hatch slide arrangement. The liner in the cabin is a separate moulding and contains two berth cushions and a sink.

Keel
The fin keel is of cast iron with a double resin coating to prevent corrosion and is of a hydrodynamic design supplying maximum lift with good stability. The keel is mounted to the hull and has a separate moulded keel grid that provides greater strength in this area. The keel is attached with  stainless steel flat head bolts, nuts and flat washers. No gasket is used to mount the keel as the mating surfaces are well matched. Keels are mounted at the factory using a silicone marine sealer between the keel and hull.

Rudder
The rudder is a spade type made of fiberglass with a brass rudder stock. The rudder port is a bronze tube with bushings top and bottom. Steering is by tiller. The tiller head is cast bronze and is held on with a pin. This pin passes horizontally through the head and stock. An allen screw locks into a key in the rudder stock. The tiller is straight grained ash. The rudder can be rotated a full 360 degrees if needed.

Deck hardware
Fully equipped for sailing, the Bluejacket 23 has deck hardware of stainless steel, Marinium and chromed brass. Fiberglass winch bases mount two No.1 snubbing winches used for headsail sheeting.

Mast and boom
The anodized aluminum deck stepped mast and boom are aluminum type 6351 alloy and have integral sail slots and non-geared roller reefing.

Standing and running rigging
Standing rigging is 1 x 19 stainless steel wire rope (breaking strength ) with swage terminals, stainless steel turnbuckles and chain plates. Running rigging is of Samson braid, including jib sheets and main sheet. Halyards are stainless steel having dacron rope tails.

Sails
This yacht comes equipped with a  mainsail as well as a working jib as standard equipment. A No. 1 Genoa and a Spinnaker are optional.

Outboard motor well
The lazarette contains a built in outboard well, which includes access hatch and well plug. This well is bulkheaded off from the main hull and is of the self-draining, non-filling type. There is an access door through the bulkhead for outboard operation [recommended 3 - 6 H.P. (not supplied)]. A shelf for gasoline tanks and a well plug that fairs the well opening in the hull for racing is supplied.

Like most outboard wells, it is possible to take water in under some operating conditions. The following procedure is recommended to minimize this problem:
Remove the motor from the well when sailing. This will reduce drag and contribute to better sailing qualities.
Install the plug insert. This will keep much of the water out of the well.
Remove the drain plug from the forward part of the motor well box. This will allow any water to drain out. When under power, decide on conditions if the plug is best left in or out.

Trim
All wood trim is No. 1 grade, oiled teak and includes hand rails on cabin, cabin trim, cockpit trim and rub rails. The tiller is straight grained ash.

Cabin
(MORCEE Model Only) The cabin is fully enclosed and has two fixed lights in the cabin top for visibility and interior illumination. The companionway closes with teak hatch slides. Forward a double V berth is raised a few inches above the cabin sole and is fitted with two 3" foam cushions in a choice of colours. To port, supplied as standard, is a galley unit with sink and integral water tank filled through a plug located in one corner. To starboard, provision has been made for installation of a marine head (optional). Two forward utility shelves are moulded above the berths. There is a small hatch in the cabin sole top access the bilge.

Optional extra equipment

Genoa Gear
Spinnaker Gear
Roller Reefing
No. 1 Top action Halyard Winch
Marine Head installed, with seacocks
Rally Head (chemical toilet)
Main sheet traveller
Anti-fouling bottom paint
Spray Shield, Dodger
Boom Tent
Bow Pulpit
Lifelines and Stanchions
Flag Halyard
Cushions, cabin, red, blue, beige, green
Cockpit Cushions
Kenyon Morcee trimmer Knotmeter (0-10 Knots)
Henderson Bilge Pump (installed)
Two-tone deck

Paceship Sails

Mainsail (standard equipment)
Jib (standard equipment)
No. 1 Genoa
Spinnaker

Electrical system
Running lights to International standards, interior light, switches, wiring, fuse box, battery and case.

Operational history
The boat was at one time supported by an active class club, The Paceship, but the club is currently inactive.

In a 2010 review Steve Henkel wrote, "This early design, only 22' 1" on deck but 22' 10" if the extended reverse transom is counted, is by George Cuthbertson, later a partner in the famed C&C design firm. She is remarkable for her sleek looks, rare as early as the year 1967, The Grampian Classic 22 ... is virtually the same design, except for elimination of the Paceship's reverse transom ... Best features: The Paceship Bluejacket ... has positive flotation for safety. A big lazarette hatch has a well inside for an outboard. To our eye she appears to be sleek and graceful. Worst features: While all the comp[etitor]s ... offer weekending accommodations, the Paceship's are most spartan. The cockpit is not self-bailing, requiring the use of canvas covers to keep rain from swamping the boat when left at a mooring or slip for any length of time. Sitting headroom, at a bare 3' 1" is lowest of all her comp[etetor]s."

See also
List of sailing boat types

Similar sailboats

Beneteau First 235
C&C 25
Capri 22
Classic 22
COM-PAC 19
CS 22
DS-22
J/24
Kirby 25
Mirage 24
Newport 20
Nutmeg 24
O'Day 23
Paceship PY 23
Ranger 22
Rob Roy 23
Santana 22
Soling
Sonic 23
Tanzer 22
Triton 22
US Yachts US 22
X-79

References

External links

Keelboats
1960s sailboat type designs
Sailing yachts
Trailer sailers
Sailboat types built in Canada
Sailboat type designs by C&C Design
Sailboat types built by Paceship Yachts